Petr Korda and Cyril Suk won in the final 7–6, 5–7, 6–3 against Mike Bauer and Marc-Kevin Goellner.

Seeds

  Grant Connell /  Patrick Galbraith (first round)
  Jakob Hlasek  /  Patrick McEnroe (first round)
  Paul Haarhuis /  Jan Siemerink (first round)
 n/a
  Andrei Olhovskiy /  Menno Oosting (semifinals)

Draw

Draw

External links
 Draw

1993 Gerry Weber Open